Angela Margaret Scoular (8 November 1945 – 11 April 2011) was a British actress.

Early life
Her father was an engineer and she was born in London. She attended St George's School, Harpenden, Queen's College, Harley Street and RADA.

Career
Scoular was among a small group of actors to have appeared in two James Bond films, made by different production companies. Scoular played Buttercup in the comedy Casino Royale (1967) and then two years later made an appearance in the Eon Productions Bond film series playing Ruby in On Her Majesty's Secret Service (1969).

Her other film credits include A Countess from Hong Kong (1967), Here We Go Round the Mulberry Bush (1968), Great Catherine (also 1968), Doctor in Trouble (1970), The Adventurers (1970), Adventures of a Taxi Driver (1976), and Adventures of a Private Eye (1977).

Her television credits included playing Cathy in a 1967 BBC production of Wuthering Heights, Doctor in the House, The Avengers, Coronation Street, Penmarric, As Time Goes By and You Rang, M'Lord? (in the recurring role of Lady Agatha Shawcross).

Scoular appeared in a play entitled Little Lies, starring Sir John Mills, at the Wyndham's Theatre, London, England, which ran from July 1983 through February 1984, written by Joseph George Caruso. The play was produced at the Royal Alexandra Theatre, Toronto, Canada in 1984, with the same cast, for six weeks.

Personal life
She was a niece of actress Margaret Johnston. She moved in with actor Leslie Phillips in 1977, at which time she was pregnant by another actor. She brought up her son with Phillips and married him in 1982.

Illnesses and death
Scoular had depression and anorexia nervosa. She attempted suicide in 1992. It was revealed in March 2009 that she had bowel cancer; she was eventually declared cancer-free, but in the months preceding her death she had feared its return. Weeks before her death, she was arrested for driving under the influence.

She died on 11 April 2011 after ingesting acid drain cleaner and pouring it on her body, causing lethal burns to her digestive tract and skin. She was survived by Phillips and her son, Daniel. An inquest at Westminster Coroner's Court on 20 July 2011 established that Scoular had been an alcoholic and had depression and anxiety about debts; she was on medication for bipolar disorder at the time of her death. The coroner recorded that Scoular had "killed herself while the balance of her mind was disturbed", and stated that her death was not suicide.

Filmography
Wuthering Heights (1967) - Cathy Earnshaw
A Countess from Hong Kong (1967) - The Society Girl
Casino Royale (1967) - Buttercup
Here We Go Round the Mulberry Bush (1968) - Caroline Beauchamp
Great Catherine (1968) - Claire
On Her Majesty's Secret Service (1969) - Ruby Bartlett
The Adventurers (1970) - Denisonde
Doctor in Trouble (1970) - Ophelia O'Brien
Adventures of a Taxi Driver (1976) - Marion
Adventures of a Private Eye (1977) - Jane Hogg

References

External links

1945 births
2011 deaths
20th-century English actresses
Actresses from London
English film actresses
English television actresses
Female suicides
People with bipolar disorder
Suicides by poison
Suicides in Westminster
Alumni of RADA
2011 suicides
20th-century British businesspeople